The 1990 Sun Belt Conference men's basketball tournament was held March 3–5 at the Birmingham–Jefferson Civic Center in Birmingham, Alabama.

South Florida defeated  in the championship game, 81–74, to win their first Sun Belt men's basketball tournament.

The Bulls, in turn, received an automatic bid to the 1990 NCAA tournament, their first appearance in the Division I tournament. They were joined in the tournament by regular season champions UAB, who received an at-large bid.

Format
There were no changes to the existing tournament format. All eight conference members were placed into the initial quarterfinal round and each team was seeded based on its regular season conference record.

Bracket

See also
Sun Belt Conference women's basketball tournament

References

Sun Belt Conference men's basketball tournament
Tournament
Sun Belt Conference men's basketball tournament
Sun Belt Conference men's basketball tournament